Radical 20 or radical wrap meaning "wrap" is one of the 23 Kangxi radicals (214 radicals total) composed of 2 strokes.

In the Kangxi Dictionary, there are 64 characters (out of 49,030) to be found under this radical.

 is also the 13th indexing component in the Table of Indexing Chinese Character Components predominantly adopted by Simplified Chinese dictionaries published in mainland China.

Evolution

Derived characters

Literature

External links

Unihan Database - U+52F9

020
013